Abutilon fruticosum is a widespread species of flowering plant in the mallow family known by the common names Texas Indian mallow, pelotazo, and sweet Indian mallow. It is native to Africa, southern and southwestern Asia (from Saudi Arabia to India), northern Mexico, and the south-central United States.

Abutilon fruticosum is a perennial herb growing up to 1.8 meters (6 feet) tall, but usually not exceeding 90 centimeters (3 feet). The alternately arranged leaves are up to 10 centimeters (4 inches) long. The blades are thick and coated in hairs, appearing gray. The yellow-orange flowers are up to about 2.5 centimeters (1 inch) wide. Flowering occurs in June through October in Texas.

Abutilon fruticosum grows in chaparral and woodlands and on prairies. It grows on cliffs, slopes, and limestone outcrops.

Abutilon fruticosum is eaten by wild and domesticated ungulates. The seeds provide food for birds such as the bobwhite quail. The flowers attract birds and butterflies. It is host to larvae of a number of butterfly species.

Abutilon fruticosum is drought-tolerant and can be used in xeriscaping.

References

External links

United States Department of Agriculture Plants Profile
Photo of herbarium specimen at Missouri Botanical Garden, collected in Ethiopia in 1805
Photo of herbarium specimen at Missouri Botanical Garden, collected in Coahuila in 2000

fruticosum
Flora of temperate Asia
Flora of Africa
Flora of the South-Central United States
Plants described in 1831
Flora of tropical Asia
Flora of Arkansas
Flora of Oklahoma
Flora of Northeastern Mexico